Ola Svanberg (born June 10, 1985, in Tranemo) is a Swedish ice hockey player. He is currently playing with the VIK Västerås HK after having transferred from Brynäs IF in the Elitserien on 30 January 2009.

References

External links

1985 births
Brynäs IF players
HV71 players
IK Oskarshamn players
Living people
People from Tranemo Municipality
Rögle BK players
Swedish ice hockey defencemen
VIK Västerås HK players
Sportspeople from Västra Götaland County